Chu Shisheng (born 20 October 1959) is a Chinese fencer. He competed in the individual and team foil events at the 1984 Summer Olympics.

References

External links
 

1959 births
Living people
Chinese male foil fencers
Olympic fencers of China
Fencers at the 1984 Summer Olympics